Rod Paradot (born 1996) is a French actor. He won the César Award for Most Promising Actor in 2016 for his role in Standing Tall.

Filmography

In 2019 Paradot starred in Petit Biscuit's "We Were Young" music video.

References

External links

 
Instagram: Rod Paradot
Twitter @paradot_rod

French male actors
1996 births
21st-century French male actors
Most Promising Actor César Award winners
Most Promising Actor Lumières Award winners
People from Saint-Denis, Seine-Saint-Denis
Living people